Thomas Callaway may refer to:

 CeeLo Green (born Thomas DeCarlo Callaway, born 1975), American recording artist
 Thomas L. Callaway, American director and cinematographer
 Thomas Callaway (actor and interior designer), American retired actor turned interior designer